Dolocosa is a genus of spiders in the family Lycosidae. It was first described in 1960 by Roewer. , it contains only one species, Dolocosa dolosa, on the island of Saint Helena.

References

Lycosidae
Monotypic Araneomorphae genera
Spiders of Oceania
Taxa named by Carl Friedrich Roewer